OktoberTrek was an American science-fiction convention held from 1990-1992 by Sandy Zier-Teitler in Hunt Valley, Maryland. The convention was fan-run, not-for-profit, and had programming for various topics such as a competitive masquerade, an Art Show, filking, media, gaming, and celebrity guest appearances. The convention was the successor to ClipperCon(1984-1989) and was succeeded by Farpoint(1993–present).

Locations and Dates

*Attendance numbers do not reflect dealers and guests

History

Defunct science fiction conventions in the United States
Recurring events established in 1990
1990 establishments in Maryland
Conventions in Baltimore